The 1975–76 season was the 65th season in Hajduk Split's history and their 30th season in the Yugoslav First League. Their 1st-place finish in the 1974–75 season meant it was their 30th successive season playing in the Yugoslav First League.

Competitions

Overall

Yugoslav First League

Classification

Results summary

Results by round

Matches

First League

Source: hajduk.hr

Yugoslav Cup

Sources: hajduk.hr

European Cup

Source: hajduk.hr

Player seasonal records

Top scorers

Source: Competitive matches

See also
1975–76 Yugoslav First League
1975–76 Yugoslav Cup

External sources
 1975–76 Yugoslav First League at rsssf.com
 1975–76 Yugoslav Cup at rsssf.com
 1975–76 European Cup at rsssf.com

HNK Hajduk Split seasons
Hajduk Split